The 2010 ANZ Championship season was the third season of the ANZ Championship. The 2010 season began on 20 March and concluded on 11 July. New South Wales Swifts went through the entire regular season home and away undefeated, winning 13 consecutive matches and finishing as minor premiers. They were the first team in the history of the ANZ Championship to do this. However they subsequently lost both the major semi-final and the preliminary final to Adelaide Thunderbirds and Waikato Bay of Plenty Magic respectively and eventually finished the season in third place. After defeating Swifts in the major semi-final, Thunderbirds defeated Magic 52–42 in the grand final, winning their third premiership.

Transfers

Head coaches and captains

Pre-season 

Notes
  Other participants included  and Eastwood Ryde of the New South Wales Premier League

Regular season 
New South Wales Swifts went through the entire regular season home and away undefeated, winning 13 consecutive matches and finishing as minor premiers. They were the first team in the history of the ANZ Championship to do this.

Round 1

Round 2

Round 3

Round 4: Rivalry Round
Round 4 featured five Australia verses New Zealand matches. Goals scored by Australian and New Zealand teams were added together and the country with the most goals won the Rivalry Round Trophy. After five matches, Australia won the 2010 Rivalry Round 4–1 and by 288–230.

Round 5

Round 6

Round 7

Round 8

Round 9

Round 10

Round 11

Round 12

Round 13

Round 14

Final table

Playoffs

Major semi-final

Minor semi-final

Preliminary final

Grand final

Season statistics 
As of 21 June 2010.

Award winners

ANZ Championship awards

Australian Netball Awards

Holden Cruze award

Gallery

References

 
2010
2010 in Australian netball
2010 in New Zealand netball